Blizzard of 2022 may refer to:

 January 2022 North American blizzard
 Late December 2022 North American winter storm

2022 meteorology